Japanese ideals of female beauty are a cultural set of aesthetic standards in relevance to physical beauty. From the history, up until today the standards have changed throughout evolution, but well cared for skin and a light skin tone remains to be the foundation of Japanese beauty.

History 
During the Heian period (764–1185) Japan developed a unique aesthetic, shifting away from the Chinese influences. Both of these countries however regarded slim eyes as beautiful, as well as a high bridged nose. This is evident in almost all of the earliest of visual sources such as artworks known as Ukiyo-e, and historical writings describing people. After the beauty of the eyes, the second most important was the eyebrows, and in this period the Japanese used to paint their eyebrows.

Teeth blackening, known as ohaguro also began in this period. It involved coating the teeth black with paint, mainly done by the wealthy. The black teeth imitated decay, and decay was a status symbol as only the wealthy could afford sweets, representing luxury.

By the beginning of the Edo period (1600–1868), etiquette of how to use the cosmetics correctly was of importance, with emphasis of the colours white, red and black. The use of white face powder to create a flawless complexion was regularly used as it was what was considered beautiful. Heavy red lipstick made out of safflowers also became a trend. Teeth blackening also continued throughout this period. These beauty processes were not easily available for everyone, as it was mostly used by middle class and wealthy women.

White skin tone 
The process of face whitening can be traced back to the Edo period, however this beauty ideal still exists today. The earliest to conduct research on this topic is an anthropologist,Hiroshi Wagatsuma. He argued in his 1967 article that there was a dichotomy in the 1960s of white vs. black with the preference of white heavily endorsed in aesthetic values. This preference is rooted in Japan's own history, simply for beauty preference rather than the influence of western culture. In the fieldwork conducted by Ashikari, it was found that the same skin tone is shared amongst the Japanese as a race, in which they take pride in, and is often expressed and enhanced to represent "Japaneseness".

More recently there has been immense consumer activity with the sales of whitening products worldwide, turning it into a multi-billion-dollar industry. This phenomenon continues, but has transformed from a trivial practice where only the wealthy can partake in, to now easily accessible with an enormous amount of products to choose from. This further reinforces the ideal as almost anyone is able to partake in it now, celebrating it as a symbol of Japanese beauty.

Double eyelids and the western influence 
With a significant amount of influence from western culture, there is an extensive amount of beauty products to imitate this effect. Unlike traditional times where narrow eyes were considered the ideal, today there are products such as eyeliner, mascara and eye shadow to make the eyes look more well defined and larger. The recent desire to have the western look has led to the popularity of the double eyelid. Often in Asian cosmetics shops there are products such as eyelid glues and stickers to hold the top of the eyelid skin together to then create the illusion of the double eyelid. These products are often advertised in girls magazines such as Popteen, making it an ideal that girls partake in to achieve the desired look.

Advertisements in the cosmetics industry reinforce the ideal into the subconscious mindset of people. These advertisements often use half Japanese and half Caucasian models d. A reason for this is because they have Japanese features displaying traditional beauty, and for the audience to be able to relate to, as well as Caucasian features conforming to the western ideals. These strategic advertisements in the media show that today the traditional beauty still exists, but with more of a western influence.

Natural make up style 
It is inevitable that beauty trends change over time. After the Equal Employment Opportunity Law (Japan) in 1986, the make up style for women was heavy, emphasising their facial features by contouring, colouring in their eyebrows heavily, and using deeper lip shades. However, this shifted towards a more natural and lighter style of makeup, after the Great East Japan Earthquake in 2011. A reason for this is because it expresses a softer beauty in a sensitive time of healing.  This lighter style has continued throughout until today, with preferences of bright flawless skin, soft coloured straight eyebrows, light shimmery eyeshadows and warm toned blushes. Women opt to look more "kawaii" and elegant with minimal makeup.

References 

Female beauty
Japanese culture
Women in Japan